is a railway station on the Iida Line in Tenryū-ku, Hamamatsu, Shizuoka Prefecture, Japan, operated by Central Japan Railway Company (JR Central).

Lines
Chūbu-Tenryū Station is served by the Iida Line and is 62.4 kilometers from the starting point of the line at Toyohashi Station.

Station layout
The station has one ground-level island platform connected to the station building by a level crossing. The station is attended.

Platforms

Adjacent stations

History
Chūbu-Tenryū Station was opened on November 11, 1934. The initial plans called for the station to eventually be joined by a spur line to Tenryū-Futamata Station on the Tenryū Hamanako Line. On August 1, 1943, the Sanshin Railway was nationalized along with several other local lines to form the Iida line. 
All freight services were discontinued in 1982 Along with its division and privatization of JNR on April 1, 1987, the station came under the control and operation of the Central Japan Railway Company (JR Central).  The station was originally named Sakuma Statio (the name presently used by the next station), and renamed in 1935 as Nakappe-Tenryū Station and again at the time of nationalization as Chūbu-Tenryū Station. The latter of the two events of renaming was only a change in official pronunciation of the kanji name.

The station was formerly home to the Sakuma Rail Park, (closed November 2010) a museum with exhibits on the Japanese railway system in general, and the Iida line in particular, including numerous examples of locomotives and rolling stock.

Passenger statistics
In fiscal 2016, the station was used by an average of 130 passengers daily (boarding passengers only).

Surrounding area
Sakuma Dam
Tenryū River

See also
 List of railway stations in Japan

References

External links

  Iida Line station information

Stations of Central Japan Railway Company
Iida Line
Railway stations in Japan opened in 1934
Railway stations in Shizuoka Prefecture
Railway stations in Hamamatsu